Ascione may refer to:

People
 Aniello Ascione (fl 1680 –1708), Italian painter of still lifes
 Joe Ascione (1961–2016), American jazz drummer
 Patrick Ascione (1953-2014), French composer of electroacoustic and acousmatic music
 Roberto Ascione (born 1973), Italian entrepreneur and global thought leader
 Thierry Ascione (born 1981), retired French tour male tennis player

Other uses
 asteroid 17972 Ascione
 Ascione Company Museum